Epicephala venenata is a moth of the family Gracillariidae. It is known from Taiwan.

References

Epicephala
Moths described in 1935